Patricia "Pat" Bottrill, MBE, FRCN is a British nurse and was awarded fellowship of the Royal College of Nursing in 2004 for her outstanding contribution to the establishment and development of endoscopy and gastroenterology nursing in both the United Kingdom and  internationally.

She was awarded the MBE in the 1997 New Year Honours list for services to nursing and health care, and was awarded an RCN Award of Merit in 1995, and was Chair of RCN Council until August 2002 when she was pressured to resign after making a purportedly "inappropriate and offensive" remark at a meeting when she used the term "10 Little Niggers", the original title of Agatha Christie's very atypical murder mystery, And Then There Were None.

Bottrill denied any racial connotation and stated that the term was not used in a racial context. She stated that the term was used when in a meeting the attendance was rapidly dropping off referring to the premise of the book, as one by one the individuals are killed, leaving only one person. It was stated by the Royal College of Nursing that one need only look at Bottrill's career and years of advocacy on behalf of nurses to see that it was an unfortunate slip of the tongue, referring back to the title of a book that was once in common use.

References

British nurses
British nursing administrators
Living people
Members of the Order of the British Empire
Place of birth missing (living people)
Year of birth missing (living people)
Fellows of the Royal College of Nursing